Nora Fatehi (born 6 February 1992) is a Canadian actress, model, dancer, singer, and producer who is predominantly known for her work in the Indian film industry. She has appeared in Hindi, Telugu, Tamil and Malayalam films.

She made her debut in the Hindi film Roar: Tigers of the Sundarbans. She gained popularity in Telugu films by doing item songs in films like Temper, Baahubali: The Beginning and Kick 2 and has also starred in two Malayalam films, Double Barrel and Kayamkulam Kochunni.

In 2015, she was a contestant on the reality television show Bigg Boss 9 and was evicted on Day 84. In 2016, she was a participant in the reality television dance show Jhalak Dikhhla Jaa. She appeared in the Bollywood film Satyameva Jayate in which she was seen in the recreated version of the song "Dilbar" which crossed 20 million views on YouTube in the first 24 hours of its release, making it the first Hindi song to have garnered such numbers in India. She also collaborated with the Moroccan hip-hop group Fnaïre to release an Arabic version of the Dilbar song.

In 2019, she collaborated with Tanzanian musician and songwriter Rayvanny to release her first international English debut song Pepeta. In October 2022, she was chosen to feature in Light The Sky, a song for the 2022 FIFA World Cup in Qatar, collaborating with artists, RedOne, Manal, Balqees and Rahma Riad.

Early life 
Fatehi is of Moroccan descent. She was born and raised in Canada. She studied political science and international studies. She graduated from York University. She has stated in interviews that she considers herself "an Indian at heart."

Career 

Fatehi began her career by appearing in Hindi film Roar: Tigers of the Sundarbans. After that she debuted in Telugu films with an item number, "Ittage Recchipodham", in Puri Jagannadh's film Temper. She has also done a special appearance with Emraan Hashmi and Gurmeet Choudhary in the film Mr. X directed by Vikram Bhatt and produced by Mahesh Bhatt. Later, Fatehi appeared in item numbers for films such as Baahubali: The Beginnings  song "Manohari" and in Kick 2s song "Kukkurukuru".

In late June 2015, she signed a Telugu film Sher. In late August 2015, she signed a Telugu film Loafer which is directed by Puri Jagannadh starring opposite Varun Tej. In late November 2015 she signed a film Oopiri. In December 2015, Fatehi entered the Bigg Boss house which was in its ninth season as a wild card entrant. She spent 3 weeks inside the house until she got evicted in the 12th week (Day 83). She was also contestant on Jhalak Dikhhla Jaa in 2016. She starred in My Birthday Song. in which she is playing lead actress opposite Sanjay Suri.

In February 2019, she signed a contract with the record label T-Series as an exclusive artist, and will feature on their upcoming films, music videos, web series, and web films. She then appeared in the 2020 dance film Street Dancer 3D which became her first film with a supporting role. On 6 March 2021, Fatehi became the first African-Arab female artiste whose song "Dilbar" crossed one billion views on YouTube.
In 2022, Nora gave a performance in 2022 FIFA World Cup final closing ceremony.

Filmography

Films

Television

Web series

Music videos

Discography

Notes

References

External links 

 
 
 

1992 births
Living people
Canadian female models
Canadian film actresses
Canadian people of Moroccan descent
Canadian expatriate actresses in India
Actresses in Hindi cinema
Actresses in Tamil cinema
Actresses in Telugu cinema
Actresses in Malayalam cinema
Bigg Boss (Hindi TV series) contestants
21st-century Canadian actresses
Fifa World Cup ceremonies performers